If I Left the Zoo is the third full-length studio album of the band Jars of Clay. It was released November 9, 1999, by Essential Records.

Overview
The band's third album brought about another stylistic shift, away from the lush sound of Much Afraid and into more of a raw and quirky pop/rock sound with occasional folk overtones. Keyboard player Charlie Lowell was featured much more prominently on this album. Due to the influence of producer Dennis Herring and drummer Ben Mize, this album had more of a Counting Crows influence.

This album produced several Christian radio singles, most notably "Unforgetful You", which also appeared in the soundtrack to the 1999 film Drive Me Crazy.

Album title
The band found a picture in a stock book of an elephant whom they have affectionately named 'Agnes. They bought the picture for the album cover and then had to come up with a title. Before landing on the name If I Left the Zoo, the band tried working the titles Already, Not Yet and If I Ran the Zoo for the album. However, the latter title ran into copyright issues with a Dr. Seuss title of the same name.

Outtakes
The song "Headstrong", which appears on the compilation album Roaring Lambs, is an outtake from the If I Left the Zoo recording sessions. The song was set to be released on If I Left the Zoo since it appeared as the album's eleventh track on several internet sites before its release. The version that appears on Roaring Lambs is the version that would have made the album cut as it was also produced by Dennis Herring. The demo version of "Headstrong" appears on The White Elephant Sessions.

The name of the recording sessions for If I Left the Zoo was called the Tweed Horse Sessions. Many of the songs that made the final track listing were recorded in raw form during these sessions. However, only "Collide" and "Can't Erase It" appears on The White Elephant Sessions.

Accolades
This album was their second in a row to earn a Grammy Award for Best Pop/Contemporary Gospel Album.

Track listing

Credits 
Jars of Clay
 Dan Haseltine – lead vocals, percussion (2, 8, 10, 11), loops (2, 3, 10), backing vocals (2), handclaps (4, 8), toy piano (5), drums (10)
 Charlie Lowell – accordion (1, 2, 9), backing vocals (1-7, 9, 10, 11), Vox Jaguar organ (2, 8), handclaps (2, 8), Wurlitzer electric piano (3, 5, 8), Mellotron (3, 5), pump organ (4), acoustic piano (5, 6, 10, 11), Hammond B3 organ (5, 7, 9), Moog synthesizer (6), toy piano (6), percussion (10), strings (11)
 Stephen Mason – acoustic guitar (1, 3, 5, 6, 7), backing vocals (1-7, 9, 10, 11), Casio synthesizers (2), electric guitars (2-11), handclaps (2), car horn sounds (3), lap steel guitar (9), percussion (10)
 Matt Odmark – electric guitars (1), acoustic guitar (2-5, 7-11), handclaps (2, 8), backing vocals (2), lab technician (5), percussion (10, 11)

Additional musicians
 Dennis Herring – handclaps (2, 8), acoustic guitar (4), guitar stylings (7)
 Clay Jones – acoustic guitar (4),  mandolin (4)
 Ben Egan – lap steel guitar (6)
 Aaron Sands – bass (2-11), percussion (10)
 Ben Mize – drums (1, 2, 4-11), percussion (1, 8, 10), minute timer sounds (5)
 Joe Porter – drums (3)
 David Henry – cello (1)
 Ned Henry – violin (1)
 Jonathan Noël – backing vocals (7)

Oxford Coffee Choir on "Goodbye, Goodnight"
 Robert Cooper 
 David Fair
 Billy Hancock
 Tom Hurdle 
 Dick Marchbanks
 John Valentine

The Darwin Hobbs Gospel Choir on "I'm Alright
 Darwin Hobbs
 Sherrie Kibble
 Gale Mayes West
 Leanne Palmore
 Angela Primm
 Duawne Starling

Production

 Dennis Herring – producer, mixing 
 Robert Beeson – executive producer, art direction
 Michael Tedesco – executive producer
 Richard Hasal – engineer
 Rob Cooper – second engineer
 Ted Gainey – second engineer
 Lee Groitzsch – second engineer
 Shawn McLean – second engineer
 Clay Jones – additional mixing
 Bob Ludwig – mastering at Gateway Mastering, Portland, Maine
 Michelle Pearson – A&R production 
 Michelle Kapp – design 
 Michael Wilson – artist photography 
 John Webber – cover image photography 
 Bill Robert – in-studio photography 
 Double Down Images – couch photography

Charts and RIAA certifications

Front Yard Luge (bonus disc)

Front Yard Luge is a live, mini-album that was available with pre-order of If I Left The Zoo from select retailers.

References

1999 albums
Jars of Clay albums
Essential Records (Christian) albums
Grammy Award for Best Pop/Contemporary Gospel Album
Albums produced by Dennis Herring